Polytechnic Stadium is a multi-purpose stadium, part of the Polytechnic Sport Complex owned by Kremenchuk State University in Kremenchuk, Ukraine. Currently and historically it is the primary arena for Kremin Kremenchuk. The club intends to build its own arena, FC Kremin Stadium.

It is currently used mostly for football matches, and is the home of FC Kremin Kremenchuk. The stadium holds 12–13,000 spectators. Until 1999, it was called Dnipro Stadium as the former name of Kremin.

Other important stadiums in Kremenchuk are Vahonobudivnyk Stadium and Kredmash Stadium (former Shlyakhmash Stadium), both belonging to the same name local factories. There was also one more Naftokhimik Stadium which was one of the arenas for the 1994-95 Ukrainian Cup competition.

References

Football venues in Poltava Oblast
FC Kremin Kremenchuk
Multi-purpose stadiums in Ukraine
Sports venues in Poltava Oblast
Sport in Kremenchuk